Hossam Mohamed Ashour Sanad Atia (born 9 March 1986) is an Egyptian footballer who plays as a defensive midfielder.

After progressing through the club's youth system, Ashour established himself in the first team of Al Ahly and has won 39 domestic and continental competitions with the club, the most for any player both for a single club and at the club level in general. He is also the third most decorated player in history, only surpassed by Lionel Messi and Dani Alves. He has made more than 500 appearances in all competitions.

Having represented Egypt at under-20 level, he made his senior international debut for Egypt in 2008 and has won 14 caps.

Club career
Born in Cairo, Ashour began his career in the youth system at Al Ahly before being promoted to the first team at the age of seventeen by manager Manuel José de Jesus after attracting his attention in a youth training session. He made his debut in the Egyptian Premier League during the 2003–04 season during a march against El Mansoura. He became the youngest player in the club's history to captain the side in a match against Ittihad El Shorta during the 2009–10 season after club captain Osama Hosny was substituted.

In 2014, Ashour made his 100th appearance in the CAF Champions League during a match against Tanzanian side Young Africans, becoming only the fourth Al-Ahly player reach the tally after Essam El-Hadary, Wael Gomaa and Shady Mohamed.

In May 2017, Ashour was banned for four matches and fined 40,000 Egyptian pounds after being charged with assaulting a referee. Al Ahly manager Hossam El-Badry was also charged for an incident with the referee during the match. Ashour was appointed club captain in his thirteenth year with Al Ahly, winning his first trophy as captain in January 2018 in a 1–0 victory over Al-Masry in the 2017 Egyptian Super Cup. The trophy was his 33rd senior trophy for the club, making him the most decorated player in the club's history.

In May 2020, Ashour decided not to renew his contract with Al Ahly. In October 2020, Ashour joined Al Ittihad.

International career

Youth
Ashour represented Egypt at under-20 level, playing in the 2005 African Youth Championship in Benin as the side finished as runners-up to Nigeria. He also played for the side at the 2005 FIFA World Youth Championship as Egypt were eliminated in the group stage. He later played for the Egypt Olympic squad.

Senior
Ashour made his debut for the Egypt senior side in a 4–0 defeat to Sudan on 20 August 2008.

Honours
Al Ahly:
 Egyptian Premier League (13): 2004–05, 2005–06, 2006–07, 2007–08, 2008–09, 2009–10, 2010–11, 2013–14, 2015–16, 2016–17, 2017–18, 2018–19, 2019–20
 Egypt Cup (4): 2005–06, 2006–07, 2016–17, 2019–20
 Egyptian Super Cup (10): 2005, 2006, 2007, 2008, 2010, 2011, 2014, 2015, 2017، 2018
 CAF Champions League (6): 2005, 2006, 2008, 2012, 2013, 2020
 CAF Confederation Cup (1): 2014
 African Super Cup (5): 2006, 2007, 2009, 2013, 2014

References

External links
 

1986 births
Living people
Egyptian footballers
Association football central defenders
Al Ahly SC players
Al Ittihad Alexandria Club players
Egypt international footballers
Egyptian Premier League players
Footballers from Cairo